Bohwim is a surname. Notable people with the surname include:

Alexia Bohwim (born 1969), Norwegian writer and feminist, daughter of Knut
Knut Bohwim (1931–2020), Norwegian film director